Toubul is a village under Bishnupur district of Manipur in India with a total population of around 4044 people as per 2001 census. It is surrounded by farming lands in the west, north and south and by Loktak lake in the east. Farming and fishery are the main sources of livelihood. Toubul is one of the most affected villages by the hydroelectric power generation plant from Loktak lake (the biggest fresh water lake in north-east India).

The village is located at 24.6213°N 93.7934°E . The village is easily accessible by inter-village routes from the neighboring villages and by water from the other side of the Loktak lake. The Bishnupur-Mayang Imphal road of 14 km bypassing Toubul and Loktak lake is completed after the construction of some of the bridges. In the ancient times, it is learned that Tongjei Maril is assumed to follow through this route for transport and commerce.

It is not well known when the inhabitants of Toubul village started settling and farming. However, there are reports that Toubul is as old as the Moirang Kingdom as cited in the story of Khamba-Thoibi.

Entangled among the scenic beauty is the ascetic sense of the village being the birthplace of Bhaktisvarupa Damodar Swami with his hospital cum tourist resort which is under construction under the aegis of International Society for Krishna Consciousness (ISKCON) also known as Hare Krishna movement.

921 families live in Toubul. The village has population of 4542 of which 2264 are male while 2278 are female according to Population Census 2011. The population of children with age 0-6 is 544 which makes up 11.98% of total population. Average Sex Ratio is 1006 which is higher than the Manipur state average of 985. Child Sex Ratio per the census is 915, lower than the Manipur average of 930. Toubul has a lower literacy rate than Manipur.  The literacy rate in 2011 was 75.79%, compared to 76.94% of Manipur. Male literacy stood at 83.99% while female literacy rate was 67.74%.

As per constitution of India and Panchayati Raaj Act, Toubul is administrated by Sarpanch (Head of Village) who is an elected representative. The village is also home to some of the elite sports-persons of the country vis-a-vis multi-talented hard working residents.

Toubul and surrounding

The Toubul Ibudhou Sorarel and Yangoiningthou Seva Committee is celebrating the Ibudhou Yangoiningthou Lai Haraoba every year since the time immemorial. Each and every household of Toubul take part in the 10–15 days celebration. Maiba and Maibee play important roles by rendering the best services to the Ibudhou Yangoiningthou during these days with the offerings of flowers, fruits and vegetables followed by Lai Haraoba Jagoi (a typical Manipuri dance). At the end of the festival, it is very common to conclude with a sporting event such as Mukna (a kind of wrestling).

Geography, vegetation and climate

The east of Toubul is a sight to behold covered with the lush green surrounding and an amazing place to hang out for fresh air and cool breeze. The weather of Toubul is available in the given link Weather of Toubul. The surrounding of Toubul and distances around it is available at Distance info. The villagers depend on the fishing mainly at the surrounding. The food security and the hurdles faced by the villages are highlighted here the-trade-off-between-food-security-and-development. But the polluted water devastates both fish and human.

In 2012, a rare bird species, Glossy Ibis, has been spotted in and around Toubul.
The juxtaposition of Toubul and Loktak is a well known natural habitat of numerous species of wild and migratory birds. It is feared that this well balanced eco-system may be disturbed by human advances and called for protection.

Gallery

References

External links 
 Toubul@Facebook 
 The Choice Between Hydro Power and Food Security 

 Census 2011 

 Schools@Toubul 

Villages in Bishnupur district